Pyrgophorus platyrachis is a species of very small aquatic snail, an operculate gastropod mollusk in the family Hydrobiidae.

Distribution

Description 
The maximum recorded shell length is 5.3 mm.

Habitat 
The minimum recorded depth for this species is 0 m, and the maximum recorded depth is 0 m.

References

Hydrobiidae
Gastropods described in 1968